Nathan Thomas (born 28 August 1972) is an Australia water polo player who competed in the 2000 Summer Olympics and in the 2004 Summer Olympics. Thomas was the captain of the Australia men's national water polo team in 2004.

Personal life 
Thomas was raised in Tamworth, Australia, where he attended [[West Tamworth High School. He has since retired from water polo and has focused on other aspects of his life, such as his daughters Nioka and Zoe. His daughter Nioka has since joined UC Irvine Women's Water Polo team in hopes of one day to continue his legacy and represent Australia in the Olympics.

See also
 Australia men's Olympic water polo team records and statistics

References

External links
 

1972 births
Living people
Australian male water polo players
Olympic water polo players of Australia
Water polo players at the 2000 Summer Olympics
Water polo players at the 2004 Summer Olympics
People from Tamworth, New South Wales
Sportsmen from New South Wales